René Gillotin (1814-1861) was a French naval officer and painter.  He was born in Normandy and entered the naval school at Brest, France.  His first campaign was to South America in 1833, with a first stop at Gorée in Senegal.  1844-1846 he visited French Polynesia on the frigate La Virginie.  After promotion to lieutenant, he visited Senegal again in 1852 on the steam frigate Eldorado.  He served in the Crimean War as a commander, and made many drawings and watercolor paintings throughout his naval career.

François Jacquin, a nephew of René Gillotin, came upon a trove of writings, drawings, sketches and watercolors by his uncle.  Based upon this discovery, he published De Constantinople a Tahiti: Seize ans d'aquarelles autour du monde, 1840-1856, en suivant Rene Gillotin in 1997.  Gillotin’s style is typical of mid-19th-century French painting.  Although he is best known for his images of French Polynesia and Constantinople, he also drew and painted (presumable from life) in Africa, South America and Hawaii.

References
 Jacquin,  François, De Constantinople a Tahiti: Seize ans d'aquarelles autour du monde, 1840-1856, en suivant Rene Gillotin, Paris, Karthala, 1997

External links
 René Gillotin on AskArt.com

Footnotes

Hawaii artists
19th-century French painters
French male painters
French Navy officers
French landscape painters
Artists from Normandy
French military personnel of the Crimean War
1814 births
1861 deaths
19th-century French male artists
Military personnel from Normandy